Dr. 56 is an Indian bilingual thriller film directed by Rajesh Anandleela. Shot in Kannada and Tamil, the film was produced by the studios, Hari Hara Pictures and Sri Lakshmi Jyothi Creations. The film stars Priyamani, Praveen Reddy, Raj Deepak Shetty and Ramesh Bhat in leading roles. The film was released in theatres on 9 December 2022.

Cast 
Priyamani as Priya Krishna
Praveen Reddy T. as Arjun
Raj Deepak Shetty as Aswath
Ramesh Bhat
Veena Ponnappa
Manjunath Hegde
Yathiraj

Production 
Priyamani signed on to work on the project during June 2019, and the shoot was largely completed by August 2019. The film was simultaneously shot in Kannada and Tamil, with the actress revealing that she would portray a CBI officer. The film marked Priyamani's return to Tamil cinema after 10 years.

Release 
The film had a theatrical release on 9 December 2022. A reviewer from The New Indian Express noted "excluding the inclusion of certain commercial elements, DR 56 is quite an enjoyable murder mystery that will find welcome among the faithful of that genre". A critic from Bangalore Mirror noted "catch this film if you crave for an action thriller". The film is streaming on Amazon Prime Video from 26th February, 2023.

References

External links

2022 films
Indian multilingual films
2020s Kannada-language films
2020s Tamil-language films
Indian thriller films